The Sierra de Almijara is a mountain range in the provinces of Granada and Málaga in southern Spain.
The rocks are mainly marble, giving a white or gray color to the narrow ridges and deep ravines.
The range is mostly protected by the Sierras of Tejeda, Almijara and Alhama Natural Park.

Location

The mountains form a barrier between the coast and the interior.
They are part of the Penibaetic System.
The park contains the Sierra de Tejeda and Sierra de Almijara mountains in the Axarquía comarca of the eastern province of Málaga and the Alhama comarca on the southwest of the province of Granada.

Topography

The Sierra de Almijara is a rough mass of marble mountains with sharp ridges that stretches east from the Puerto de Cómpeta.
The mountains contain narrow ridges separated by deep valleys cut by the streams and rivers, resulting in many small sub-basins.
The most distinct peak is the Cerro del Lucero.
Navachica is the highest peak in the Sierra Almijara.
The Sierra Almijara and Sierra Tejeda form the southern margin of the western part of the Granada basin, and contain tributaries of the Cacín River.
Pliocene sediments exposed in the northwest of the Granada basin were washed down by the Cacín from the Alpujarride reliefs of the Almijara/Tejeda.

Climate

The mountains have highest rainfall in December, January and March, and lowest in July.

At low and medium elevations to climate is thermic semi-arid mediterranean.
Most of the rain is torrential and falls between November and March.

Geology

All of the park has the calcareous formations of the Subbética region, with marbles, shales, phyllites, etc.
The area is rich in quartzite and gneiss over 300 million years old.
The Sierra de Almijara holds one of the Spain's main sources of dolomitic marble.
The marble gives white and gray tones to the ridges and ravines.
The limestone has been eaten out by water to create a maze of fissures, depressions and caves, including the deep canyon of the Chíllar River and the Caves of Nerja.
The Caves of Nerja (Cueva de Nerja), with an entrance just south of the park, is a National Monument.

The parent rock consists of dolomite marble formed in the Triassic.
It is intensively folded and cut by transversal faults.
Weathering in some areas has resulted in sands of almost pure dolomite crystals with very little clay, and in stony ground of partially altered marbles. 
Sandy regosols develop with high levels of carbonates and magnesium and low levels of plant nutrients.
Erosion due to the steep slopes, lack of vegetation and fires prevent the soil from developing.

Peaks

From west to east, the named peaks are

Notes

Sources

Alhama
Tejeda
Geography of the Province of Granada
Geography of the Province of Málaga